John Davis is an American politician and a Republican member of the Oregon House of Representatives representing District 26 from 2013 until 2017.

Education
Davis attended the University of Oxford, earned his BA from George Fox University, and his JD from Willamette University College of Law.

Elections
2012 Incumbent Republican Representative Matt Wingard was unopposed for the District 26 seat in the May 15, 2012 Republican Primary, winning with 3,067 votes, but withdrew before the general election; Davis won the July 9 special election by precinct committee persons to replace him, and won the November 6, 2012 General election with 15,141 votes (55.5%) against Democratic nominee Wynne Wakkila.

Legislation

In February 2015, Davis introduced a bill to mandate reflective clothing for bicycle riders, but revised the bill in March to address bicycle lighting rather than clothing.

References

External links
 Official page at the Oregon Legislative Assembly
 Campaign site
 

Place of birth missing (living people)
Year of birth missing (living people)
Living people
Alumni of the University of Oxford
George Fox University alumni
Republican Party members of the Oregon House of Representatives
People from Wilsonville, Oregon
Willamette University College of Law alumni
21st-century American politicians